The 2008 AMA Superbike Championship was the 33rd season of the AMA Superbike Championship.  Ben Spies won the championship riding a Suzuki.

Calendar and results

Riders Championship standings

Mat Mladin won the races at VIR but was later disqualified for an illegal crankshaft.

Participants

References

AMA Superbike Championship seasons
Ama Superbike
Ama Superbike